Tail hook may refer to:

Tailhook - used on carrier based aircraft as a means to slow or halt the plane.
Bondage hook#Tail hook
Tailhook Association
Tailhook scandal